Aušra is a Lithuanian feminine given name meaning "dawn". People bearing the name Aušra include:
Aušra Augustinavičiūtė (1927–2005), Lithuanian psychologist and sociologist
Aušra Bimbaitė (born 1982), Lithuanian basketball player
Aušra Fridrikas (born 1967), Lithuanian–Austrian handball player 
Aušra Gudeliūnaitė (born 1963), Lithuanian rowing coxswain
Aušra Maldeikienė (born 1958), Lithuanian economist, politician, educator, publicist and author
Aušra Šponė (born 2001), Lithuanian handball player

References

Lithuanian feminine given names